Cupressus pigmaea, the Mendocino cypress or pygmy cypress, is a taxon of disputed status in the genus Cupressus endemic to certain coastal terraces and coastal mountain ranges of Mendocino and Sonoma Counties in northwestern California. It is a highly variable tree, and closely related to Cupressus goveniana, enough to sometimes be considered a subspecies of it.

Description
The foliage is a dull dark to light green color, with scale-like leaves 1–1.5 mm long, with the leaf tips not spreading; seedlings bear needle-like leaves 8–10 mm long. The cones are small, 11–24 mm long, and almost spherical, with six or eight scales arranged in opposite decussate pairs, with the bract visible as no more than a small lump or short spine on the scale. The seeds are 3–5 mm long, with a pair of small wings along the sides. The cones remain closed on the trees for many years, until the trees are killed by a forest fire; after the tree is dead, the cones open to release the seeds which can then germinate successfully on the bare fire-cleared ground.

The Mendocino cypress differs little from C. goveniana in morphology, with the most conspicuous difference in herbarium material being the usually glossy black seeds, unlike the dull brown seeds of C. goveniana, but even this character is not constant, with dull brown seeds found in the southernmost populations of C. pigmaea near Point Arena. Preliminary genetic studies have shown some differences, with notably some plastid sequences (matK, rbcL, and trnL) suggesting a possible closer relationship to C. macrocarpa, though other sequences confirm its close relationship to C. goveniana. In cultivation together with C. goveniana, it retains a very different crown shape, with a tall slender crown, contrasting with the broad, shrubby crown of C. goveniana; it also has darker green foliage (paler, yellow-green in C. goveniana).

The largest recorded specimen is located in Mendocino County, with recorded dimensions of 43 m height, 2.13 m diameter, and 12 m crown spread, in 2000.

Taxonomy
Its taxonomic status is disputed by different authors. Some treat Cupressus pigmaea as a distinct species, following Sargent, including Wolf (1948), Griffin & Critchfield (1976), Lanner (1999), and Little et al. (2004), while others treat it within Cupressus goveniana as either a variety (C. goveniana var. pigmaea Lemmon) or a subspecies (C. goveniana subsp. pigmaea (Lemmon) A.Camus), including Camus (1914), and the Jepson Manual (1993), and yet others do not distinguish it at all within C. goveniana, including the Flora of North America and Farjon (2005).

The scientific name is sometimes spelled pygmaea, though this is an orthographic error.

Distribution and habitat
The Mendocino cypress is highly variable in growth form, depending on soil conditions. In the pygmy forest plant community on poor, acidic, nutrient-starved podsol soils with drainage impeded by an iron hardpan, it is a stunted tree from 0.2–5 meters in height at maturity. When occurring in its pygmy form, it is sometimes called pygmy cypress.  When growing on deep, well-drained soils it can be a large tree up to 30–50 meters in height and 1–2.4 m in trunk diameter. The bark is dark gray-brown, with stringy texture, and fissured on old trees.

Mendocino cypress occurs in very limited ranges within only Mendocino County, on some of the historical lands of the Yuki Native American people. In Mendocino County the occurrence is in a discontinuous coastal terrace strip, primarily as a pygmy forest associated with bishop pine (Pinus muricata) and Mendocino shore pine (P. contorta var. bolanderi). Occurrences are typically below 500 m in elevation. The Mendocino County official soils survey states that "While not formally recognized as a major forest cover type, the coastal portion of the survey area also includes bishop pine and Mendocino cypress (pygmy) forest types".

Productivity
Along the Mendocino coastal terraces, whose geological age is approximately one million years, studies have been conducted of the biomass density and primary productivity of the Cupressus pygmaea-dominated pygmy forest. The terraces in this area extend a full five to ten kilometers inland from the Pacific Ocean.

In the Mendocino cypress pygmy forests, biomass was measured to range between 1.6 and 4.4 kilograms per square meter aboveground; moreover, net primary productivity was found to measure 180 to 360 grams per square meter per annum above the ground surface. Mean below-ground values are 3.5 kilograms biomass per square meter, productivity being 402 grams per meter per annum. The leaf-area ratio of the pygmy forest was estimated as 2.1 grams per square meter implying a high production efficiency per unit leaf area for an evergreen community (150 grams per meter aboveground ). According to Westman, productivity of the C. pygmaea forest lies within the range expected for open, dry woodlands. A similar community for which data is available is a pygmy conifer-oak scrubland in southern Arizona.

References

External links

pigmaea
Endemic flora of California
Trees of the Southwestern United States
Natural history of the California Coast Ranges
Natural history of Mendocino County, California
Natural history of Sonoma County, California
Trees of mild maritime climate
Plants described in 1895
Flora without expected TNC conservation status